Alberto Selva (born 21 September 1964) is a Sammarinese lawyer and politician, who was Captain Regent of San Marino for the term October 2007 - March 2008, together with Mirko Tomassoni.

Selva, a lawyer, is a member of the Alleanza Popolare. He was elected in June 2006 to the Grand and General Council.

Selva had studied law at the University of Bologna.

External links
Alberto Selva designato da AP prossimo Capitano Reggente 

1964 births
Living people
People from the City of San Marino
University of Bologna alumni
Members of the Grand and General Council
Captains Regent of San Marino
Sammarinese lawyers
Popular Alliance (San Marino) politicians